The Best Translated Book Award is an American literary award that recognizes the previous year's best original translation into English, one book of poetry and one of fiction. It was inaugurated in 2008 and is conferred by Three Percent, the online literary magazine of Open Letter Books, which is the book translation press of the University of Rochester. A long list and short list are announced leading up to the award.

The award takes into consideration not only the quality of the translation but the entire package: the work of the original writer, translator, editor, and publisher. The award is "an opportunity to honor and celebrate the translators, editors, publishers, and other literary supporters who help make literature from other cultures available to American readers."

In October 2010 Amazon.com announced it would be underwriting the prize with a $25,000 grant. This would allow both the translator and author to receive a $5,000 prize. Prior to this the award did not carry a cash prize.

Winners

Fiction

Poetry

Awards

The first awards were given in 2008 for books published in 2007. The Best Translation Book Awards are dated by the presentation year, with the book publication the previous year.

 = winner.

2008
The award was announced January 4, 2008 for books published in 2007. It was the first award and was based on open voting by readers of Three Percent, who also nominated the longlist.

Fiction shortlist
 Guantanamo by Dorothea Dieckmann, translated from German by Tim Mohr. (Soft Skull)
The Savage Detectives by Roberto Bolaño, translated from Spanish by Natasha Wimmer. (FSG)
Autonauts of the Cosmoroute by Julio Cortázar, translated from Spanish by Anne McLean. (Archipelago Books)
Missing Soluch by Mahmoud Dowlatabadi, translated from Persian by Kamran Rastegar. (Melville House)
Ravel by Jean Echenoz, translated from French by Linda Coverdale. (New Press)
Sunflower by Gyula Krúdy, translated from Hungarian by John Batki. (NYRB)
Out Stealing Horses by Per Petterson, translated from Norwegian by Anne Born. (Graywolf Press)
Omega Minor by Paul Verhaeghen, translated from Dutch by the author. (Dalkey Archive)
Montano's Malady by Enrique Vila-Matas, translated from Spanish by Jonathan Dunne. (New Directions)
The Assistant by Robert Walser, translated from German by Susan Bernofsky. (New Directions)

Poetry shortlist
The Drug of Art: Selected Poems by Ivan Blatny, translated from Czech by Justin Quinn, Matthew Sweney, Alex Zucker, Veronika Tuckerova, and Anna Moschovakis. (Ugly Duckling)
The Dream of the Poem: Hebrew Poetry from Muslim and Christian Spain, 950–1492 edited and translated from Hebrew by Peter Cole. (Princeton)
The Collected Poems: 1956–1998 by Zbigniew Herbert, translated from Polish by Czesław Miłosz, Peter Dale Scott, and Alissa Valles. (Ecco)

2009
The award was announced February 19, 2009 for book published in 2008. There was a ceremony at Melville House Publishing in Brooklyn hosted by author and critic Francisco Goldman.

Fiction shortlist
 Tranquility by Attila Bartis, translated from Hungarian by Imre Goldstein. (Archipelago Books)
2666 by Roberto Bolaño, translated from Spanish by Natasha Wimmer. (Farrar, Straus & Giroux)
Nazi Literature in the Americas by Roberto Bolaño, translated from Spanish by Chris Andrews. (New Directions)
Voice Over by Céline Curiol, translated from French by Sam Richard. (Seven Stories)
The Darkroom of Damocles by Willem Frederik Hermans, translated from Dutch by Ina Rilke. (Overlook)
Yalo by Elias Khoury, translated from Arabic by Peter Theroux. (Archipelago Books)
Senselessness by Horacio Castellanos Moya, translated from Spanish by Katherine Silver. (New Directions)
Unforgiving Years by Victor Serge, translated from French by Richard Greeman. (New York Review of Books)
Bonsai by Alejandro Zambra, translated from Spanish by Carolina De Robertis. (Melville House Publishing)
The Post Office Girl by Stefan Zweig, translated from German by Joel Rotenberg. (New York Review of Books)

Poetry shortlist
 For the Fighting Spirit of the Walnut by Takashi Hiraide, translated from Japanese by Sawako Nakayasu. (New Directions)
Essential Poems and Writings by Robert Desnos, translated from French by Mary Ann Caws, Terry Hale, Bill Zavatsky, Martin Sorrell, Jonathan Eburne, Katherine Connelly, Patricia Terry, and Paul Auster. (Black Widow)
You Are the Business by Caroline Dubois, translated from French by Cole Swensen. (Burning Deck)
As It Turned Out by Dmitry Golynko, translated from Russian by Eugene Ostashevsky, Rebecca Bella, and Simona Schneider. (Ugly Duckling)
Poems of A.O. Barnabooth by Valery Larbaud, translated from French by Ron Padgett & Bill Zavatsky. (Black Widow)
Night Wraps the Sky by Vladimir Mayakovsky, translated from Russian by Katya Apekina, Val Vinokur, and Matvei Yankelevich, and edited by Michael Almereyda. (Farrar, Straus & Giroux)
A Different Practice by Fredrik Nyberg, translated from Swedish by Jennifer Hayashida. (Ugly Duckling)
EyeSeas by Raymond Queneau, translated from French by Daniela Hurezanu and Stephen Kessler. (Black Widow)
Peregrinary by Eugeniusz Tkaczyszyn-Dycki, translated from Polish by Bill Johnston. (Zephyr)
Eternal Enemies by Adam Zagajewski, translated from Polish by Clare Cavanagh. (Farrar, Straus & Giroux)

2010
The award was announced March 10, 2010 at Idlewild Books. According to award organizer Chad Post, "On the fiction side of things we debated and debated for weeks. There were easily four other titles that could've easily won this thing. Walser, Prieto, Aira were all very strong contenders."

Fiction shortlist
 The Confessions of Noa Weber by Gail Hareven. Translated from Hebrew by Dalya Bilu. (Israel, Melville House Publishing)
Anonymous Celebrity by Ignácio de Loyola Brandão. Translated from Portuguese by Nelson Vieira. (Brazil, Dalkey Archive)
The Discoverer by Jan Kjaerstad. Translated from Norwegian by Barbara Haveland. (Norway, Open Letter)
Ghosts by Cesar Aira. Translated from Spanish by Chris Andrews. (Argentina, New Directions)
Memories of the Future by Sigizmund Krzhizhanovsky. Translated from Russian by Joanne Turnbull. (Russia, New York Review Books)
Rex by José Manuel Prieto. Translated from Spanish by Esther Allen. (Cuba, Grove Books)
The Tanners by Robert Walser. Translated from German by Susan Bernofsky. (Switzerland, New Directions)
The Twin by Gerbrand Bakker. Translated from Dutch by David Colmer. (Netherlands, Archipelago Books)
The Weather Fifteen Years Ago by Wolf Haas. Translated from German by Stephanie Gilardi and Thomas S. Hansen. (Austria, Ariadne Press)
 Wonder by Hugo Claus. Translated from Dutch by Michael Henry Heim. (Belgium, Archipelago Books)

Poetry shortlist
 Elena Fanailova, The Russian Version. Translated from Russian by Genya Turovskaya and Stephanie Sandler. (Russia, Ugly Duckling Presse)
Nicole Brossard, Selections. Translated from French by various. (Canada, University of California)
René Char, The Brittle Age and Returning Upland. Translated from French by Gustaf Sobin. (France, Counterpath)
Mahmoud Darwish, If I Were Another. Translated from Arabic by Fady Joudah (Palestine, FSG)
Hiromi Ito, Killing Kanoko. Translated from Japanese by Jeffrey Angles. (Japan, Action Books)
Marcelijus Martinaitis, KB: The Suspect. Translated from Lithuanian by Laima Vince. (Lithuania, White Pine)
Heeduk Ra, Scale and Stairs. Translated from Korean by Woo-Chung Kim and Christopher Merrill. (Korea, White Pine)
Novica Tadic, Dark Things. Translated from Serbian by Charles Simic. (Serbia, BOA Editions)
Liliana Ursu, Lightwall. Translated from Romanian by Sean Cotter. (Romania, Zephyr Press)
Wei Ying-wu, In Such Hard Times. Translated from Chinese by Red Pine. (China, Copper Canyon)

2011
The longlist was announced January 27, 2011. The shortlist was announced March 24, 2011. The winners were announced April 29, 2011 at the PEN World Voices Festival by Lorin Stein.

Fiction shortlist

 The True Deceiver by Tove Jansson, translated from Swedish by Thomas Teal (New York Review Books) 
The Literary Conference by César Aira, translated from Spanish by Katherine Silver (New Directions)
The Golden Age by Michal Ajvaz, translated from Czech by Andrew Oakland (Dalkey Archive)
A Life on Paper by Georges-Olivier Châteaureynaud, translated from French by Edward Gauvin (Small Beer)
The Jokers by Albert Cossery, translated from French by Anna Moschovakis (New York Review Books)
Visitation by Jenny Erpenbeck, translated from German by Susan Bernofsky (New Directions)
Hocus Bogus by Romain Gary (writing as Émile Ajar), translated from French by David Bellos (Yale University Press)
On Elegance While Sleeping by Emilio Lascano Tegui, translated from Spanish by Idra Novey (Dalkey Archive)
Agaat by Marlene Van Niekerk, translated from Afrikaans by Michiel Heyns (Tin House)
Georg Letham: Physician and Murderer by Ernst Weiss, translated from German by Joel Rotenberg (Archipelago)

Poetry shortlist

 The Book of Things by Aleš Šteger, translated from Slovenian by Brian Henry (BOA Editions) 
Geometries by Eugene Guillevic, translated from French by Richard Sieburth (Ugly Ducking)
Flash Cards by Yu Jian, translated from Chinese by Wang Ping and Ron Padgett (Zephyr Press)
Time of Sky & Castles in the Air by Ayane Kawata, translated from Japanese by Sawako Nakayasu (Litmus Press)
Child of Nature by Luljeta Lleshanaku, translated from Albanian by Henry Israeli and Shpresa Qatipi (New Directions)

2012
The longlist was announced February 28, 2012. The shortlist was announced April 10, 2012. The winners were announced May 4, 2012.

Fiction shortlist

 Stone Upon Stone by Wiesław Myśliwski, translated from Polish by Bill Johnston (Archipelago Books) 
 Lightning by Jean Echenoz, translated from French by Linda Coverdale (New Press)
 Upstaged by Jacques Jouet, translated from French by Leland de la Durantaye (Dalkey Archive Press)
 Kornél Esti by Kosztolányi Dezső, translated from Hungarian by Bernard Adams (New Directions)
 I Am a Japanese Writer by Dany Laferrière, translated from French by David Homel (Douglas & MacIntyre)
 New Finnish Grammar by Diego Marani, translated from Italian by Judith Landry (Dedalus)
 Scars by Juan José Saer, translated from Spanish by Steve Dolph (Open Letter)
 Kafka's Leopards by Moacyr Scliar, translated from Portuguese by Thomas O. Beebee (Texas Tech University Press)
 In Red by Magdalena Tulli, translated from Polish by Bill Johnston (Archipelago Books)
 Never Any End to Paris by Enrique Vila-Matas, translated from Spanish by Anne McLean (New Directions)

Poetry shortlist

 Spectacle & Pigsty by Kiwao Nomura, translated from Japanese by Kyoko Yoshida and Forrest Gander (Omnidawn)
 Hagar Before the Occupation, Hagar After the Occupation by Amal al-Jubouri, translated from Arabic by Rebecca Gayle Howell with Husam Qaisi (Alice James Books)
 Last Verses by Jules Laforgue, translated from French by Donald Revell (Omnidawn)
 A Fireproof Box by Gleb Shulpyakov, translated from Russian by Christopher Mattison (Canarium Books)
 engulf—enkindle by Anja Utler, translation from the German by Kurt Beals (Burning Deck)
 False Friends by Uljana Wolf, translated from German by Susan Bernofsky (Ugly Duckling Presse)

2013
The longlist was announced March 5, 2013. The shortlist was announced April 10, 2013. The winners were announced May 6, 2013.

Fiction shortlist

 Satantango by László Krasznahorkai, translated from Hungarian by George Szirtes (New Directions; Hungary)
The Planets by Sergio Chejfec, translated from Spanish by Heather Cleary (Open Letter Books; Argentina)
Prehistoric Times by Eric Chevillard, translated from French by Alyson Waters (Archipelago Books; France)
The Colonel by Mahmoud Dowlatabadi, translated from Persian by Tom Patterdale (Melville House; Iran)
Autoportrait by Edouard Levé, translated from French by Lorin Stein (Dalkey Archive Press; France)
A Breath of Life: Pulsations by Clarice Lispector, translated from Portuguese by Johnny Lorenz (New Directions; Brazil)
The Hunger Angel by Herta Müller, translated from German by Philip Boehm (Metropolitan Books; Romania)
Maidenhair by Mikhail Shishkin, translated from Russian by Marian Schwartz (Open Letter Books; Russia)
Transit by Abdourahman A. Waberi, translated from French by David Ball and Nicole Ball (Indiana University Press; Djibouti)
My Father's Book by Urs Widmer, translated from German by Donal McLaughlin (Seagull Books; Switzerland)

Poetry shortlist

 Wheel with a Single Spoke by Nichita Stănescu, translated from Romanian by Sean Cotter (Archipelago Books; Romania)
Transfer Fat by Aase Berg, translated from Swedish by Johannes Göransson (Ugly Duckling Press; Sweden)
pH Neutral History by Lidija Dimkovska, translated from Macedonian by Ljubica Arsovska and Peggy Reid (Copper Canyon Press; Macedonia)
The Invention of Glass by Emmanuel Hocquard, translated from French by Cole Swensen and Rod Smith (Canarium Books; France)
Notes on the Mosquito by Xi Chuan, translated from Chinese by Lucas Klein (New Directions; China)
Almost 1 Book / Almost 1 Life by Elfriede Czurda, translated from German by Rosmarie Waldrop (Burning Deck; Austria)

2014
The longlist was announced March 11, 2014, the shortlist was announced April 14, 2014. The winners and two runners-up in each category were announced April 28, 2014.

Fiction shortlist, runners-up and winner

 Seiobo There Below by László Krasznahorkai, translated from Hungarian by Ottilie Mulzet (Hungary; New Directions)
A True Novel by Minae Mizumura, translated from Japanese by Juliet Winters (Japan; Other Press)
The African Shore by Rodrigo Rey Rosa, translated from Spanish by Jeffrey Gray (Guatemala; Yale University Press)
Horses of God by Mahi Binebine, translated from French by Lulu Norman (Morocco; Tin House)
Blinding by Mircea Cărtărescu, translated from Romanian by Sean Cotter (Romania; Archipelago Books)
The Story of a New Name by Elena Ferrante, translated from Italian by Ann Goldstein (Italy; Europa Editions)
Tirza by Arnon Grunberg, translated from Dutch by Sam Garrett (Netherlands; Open Letter Books)
My Struggle: Book Two by Karl Ove Knausgaard, translated from Norwegian by Don Bartlett (Norway; Archipelago Books)
Leg Over Leg Vol. 1 by Ahmad Faris al-Shidyaq, translated from Arabic by Humphrey Davies (Lebanon; New York University Press)
The Forbidden Kingdom by Jan Jacob Slauerhoff, translated from Dutch by Paul Vincent (Netherlands; Pushkin Press)

Poetry shortlist, runners-up and winner
 The Guest in the Wood by Elisa Biagini, translated from Italian by Diana Thow, Sarah Stickney, and Eugene Ostashevsky (Italy; Chelsea Editions)
Four Elemental Bodies by Claude Royet-Journaud, translated from French by Keith Waldrop (France; Burning Deck)
The Oasis of Now by Sohrab Sepehri, translated from Persian by Kazim Ali and Mohammad Jafar Mahallati (Iran; BOA Editions)
Relocations: 3 Contemporary Russian Women Poets by Polina Barskova, Anna Glazova, and Maria Stepanova, translated from Russian by Catherine Ciepiela, Anna Khasin, and Sibelan Forrester (Russia; Zephyr Press)
The Unknown University by Roberto Bolaño, translated from Spanish by Laura Healy (Chile, New Directions)
White Piano by Nicole Brossard, translated from French by Robert Majzels and Erín Moure (Canada; Coach House Press)
Murder by Danielle Collobert, translated from French by Nathanaël (France; Litmus Press)
In the Moremarrow by Oliverio Girondo, translated from Spanish by Molly Weigel (Argentina; Action Books)
Paul Klee's Boat by Anzhelina Polonskaya, translated from Russian by Andrew Wachtel (Russia; Zephyr Press)
His Days Go By the Way Her Years by Ye Mimi, translated from Chinese by Steve Bradbury (Taiwan; Anomalous Press)

2015
The longlist was announced April 7, 2015. The shortlist was announced May 5, 2015. The winners were announced May 27, 2015.

Fiction shortlist and winner

 The Last Lover by Can Xue, translated from Chinese by Annelise Finegan Wasmoen  (China, Yale University Press)
The Author and Me by Éric Chevillard, translated from French by Jordan Stump (France, Dalkey Archive Press)
Fantomas Versus the Multinational Vampires by Julio Cortázar, translated from Spanish by David Kurnick (Argentina, Semiotext(e))
Pushkin Hills by Sergei Dovlatov, translated from Russian by Katherine Dovlatov (Russia, Counterpoint Press)
Those Who Leave and Those Who Stay by Elena Ferrante, translated from Italian by Ann Goldstein (Italy, Europa Editions)
Things Look Different in the Light by Medardo Fraile, translated from Spanish by Margaret Jull Costa (Spain, Pushkin Press)
Harlequin's Millions by Bohumil Hrabal, translated from Czech by Stacey Knecht (Czech Republic, Archipelago Books)
The Woman Who Borrowed Memories by Tove Jansson, translated from Swedish by Thomas Teal and Silvester Mazzarella (Finland, NYRB)
Faces in the Crowd by Valeria Luiselli, translated from Spanish by Christina MacSweeney (Mexico, Coffee House Press)
La Grande by Juan José Saer, translated from Spanish by Steve Dolph (Argentina, Open Letter Books)

Poetry shortlist and winner
 Diorama by Rocío Cerón, translated from Spanish by Anna Rosenwong (Mexico, Phoneme Media)
Lazy Suzie by Suzanne Doppelt, translated from French by Cole Swensen (France, Litmus Press)
Where Are the Trees Going? by Vénus Khoury-Ghata, translated from French by Marilyn Hacker (Lebanon, Curbstone)
Diana's Tree by Alejandra Pizarnik, translated from Spanish by Yvette Siegert (Argentina, Ugly Duckling)
Compleat Catalogue of Comedic Novelties by Lev Rubinstein, translated from Russian by Philip Metres and Tatiana Tulchinsky (Russia, Ugly Duckling)
End of the City Map by Farhad Showghi, translated from German by Rosmarie Waldrop (Germany, Burning Deck)

2016 
The longlist was announced on March 29, 2016. The shortlist was announced April 19, 2016. The winners were announced May 4, 2016.

Fiction shortlist and winner 
 Signs Preceding the End of the World by Yuri Herrera, translated from Spanish by Lisa Dillman (Mexico, And Other Stories)
 A General Theory of Oblivion by José Eduardo Agualusa, translated from Portuguese by Daniel Hahn (Angola, Archipelago Books)
 Arvida by Samuel Archibald, translated from French by Donald Winkler (Canada, Biblioasis)
 The Story of the Lost Child by Elena Ferrante, translated from Italian by Ann Goldstein (Italy, Europa Editions)
 The Physics of Sorrow by Georgi Gospodinov, translated from Bulgarian by Angela Rodel (Bulgaria, Open Letter)
 Moods by Yoel Hoffmann, translated from Hebrew by Peter Cole (Israel, New Directions)
 The Complete Stories by Clarice Lispector, translated from Portuguese by Katrina Dodson (Brazil, New Directions)
 The Story of My Teeth by Valeria Luiselli, translated from Spanish by Christina MacSweeney (Mexico, Coffee House Press)
 War, So Much War by Mercè Rodoreda, translated from Catalan by Maruxa Relaño and Martha Tennent (Spain, Open Letter)
 Murder Most Serene by Gabrielle Wittkop, translated from French by Louise Rogers Lalaurie (France, Wakefield Press)

Poetry shortlist and winner
 Rilke Shake by Angélica Freitas, translated from Portuguese by Hilary Kaplan (Brazil, Phoneme Media)
 Empty Chairs: Selected Poems by Liu Xia, translated from Chinese by Ming Di and Jennifer Stern (China, Graywolf)
 Load Poems Like Guns: Women's Poetry from Herat, Afghanistan, edited and translated from Persian by Farzana Marie (Afghanistan, Holy Cow! Press)
 Silvina Ocampo by Silvina Ocampo, translated from Spanish by Jason Weiss (Argentina, NYRB)
 The Nomads, My Brothers, Go Out to Drink from the Big Dipper by Abdourahman A. Waberi, translated from French by Nancy Naomi Carlson (Djibouti, Seagull Books)
 Sea Summit by Yi Lu, translated from Chinese by Fiona Sze-Lorrain (China, Milkweed)

2017 
The longlist for fiction and poetry was announced March 28, 2017. The shortlist was announced April 19, 2017. The winners were announced May 4, 2017.

Fiction shortlist
 Chronicle of the Murdered House by Lúcio Cardoso, translated from Portuguese by Margaret Jull Costa and Robin Patterson (Brazil, Open Letter Books) 
Among Strange Victims by Daniel Saldaña Paris, translated from Spanish by Christina MacSweeney (Mexico, Coffee House Press) 
Doomi Golo by Boubacar Boris Diop, translated from Wolof and French by Vera Wülfing-Leckie and El Hadji Moustapha Diop (Senegal, Michigan State University Press) 
Eve Out of Her Ruins by Ananda Devi, translated from French by Jeffrey Zuckerman (Mauritius, Deep Vellum) 
Ladivine by Marie NDiaye, translated from French by Jordan Stump (France, Knopf) 
Oblivion by Sergi Lebedev, translated from Russian by Antonina W. Bouis (Russia, New Vessel Press) 
Umami by Laia Jufresa, translated from Spanish by Sophie Hughes (Mexico, Oneworld) 
War and Turpentine by Stefan Hertmans, translated from Dutch by David McKay (Belgium, Pantheon) 
Wicked Weeds by Pedro Cabiya, translated from Spanish by Jessica Powell (Dominican Republic, Mandel Vilar Press) 
Zama by Antonio di Benedetto, translated from Spanish by Esther Allen (Argentina, New York Review Books)

Poetry shortlist
 Extracting the Stone of Madness by Alejandra Pizarnik, translated from Spanish by Yvette Siegert (Argentina, New Directions)
Berlin-Hamlet by Szilárd Borbély, translated from Hungarian by Ottilie Mulzet (Hungary, New York Review Books) 
Of Things by Michael Donhauser, translated from German by Nick Hoff and Andrew Joron (Austria, Burning Deck Press)
Cheer Up, Femme Fatale by Yideum Kim, translated from Korean by Ji Yoon Lee, Don Mee Choi, and Johannes Göransson (South Korea, Action Books) 
In Praise of Defeat by Abdellatif Laâbi, translated from French by Donald Nicholson-Smith (Morocco, Archipelago Books)

2018 
The longlist for fiction and poetry was announced April 10, 2018. The shortlist was announced May 15, 2018. The winners were announced May 31, 2018.

Fiction shortlist
 The Invented Part by Rodrigo Fresán, translated from Spanish by Will Vanderhyden (Argentina, Open Letter Books)
Suzanne by Anaïs Barbeau-Lavalette, translated from French by Rhonda Mullins (Canada, Coach House) 
Tómas Jónsson, Bestseller by Guðbergur Bergsson, translated from Icelandic by Lytton Smith (Iceland, Open Letter Books) 
Compass by Mathias Énard, translated from French by Charlotte Mandell (France, New Directions) 
Return to the Dark Valley by Santiago Gamboa, translated from Spanish by Howard Curtis (Colombia, Europa Editions) 
Old Rendering Plant by Wolfgang Hilbig, translated from German by Isabel Fargo Cole (Germany, Two Lines Press)
I Am the Brother of XX by Fleur Jaeggy, translated from Italian by Gini Alhadeff (Switzerland, New Directions) 
My Heart Hemmed In by Marie NDiaye, translated from French by Jordan Stump (France, Two Lines Press) 
August by Romina Paula, translated from Spanish by Jennifer Croft (Argentina, Feminist Press)
Remains of Life by Wu He, translated from Chinese by Michael Berry (Taiwan, Columbia University Press)

Poetry shortlist
 Before Lyricism by Eleni Vakalo, translated from Greek by Karen Emmerich (Greece, Ugly Duckling Presse)
Hackers by Aase Berg, translated from Swedish by Johannes Goransson (Sweden, Black Ocean Press)
Paraguayan Sea by Wilson Bueno, translated from Portunhol and Guarani to Frenglish and Guarani by Erín Moure (Brazil, Nightboat Books)
Third-Millennium Heart by Ursula Andkjaer Olsen, translated from Danish by Katrine Øgaard Jensen (Denmark, Broken Dimanche Press)
Spiral Staircase by Hirato Renkichi, translated from Japanese by Sho Sugita (Japan, Ugly Duckling Press)
Directions for Use by Ana Ristović, translated from Serbian by Steven Teref and Maja Teref (Serbia, Zephyr Press)

2019 
The longlist for fiction and poetry was announced April 10, 2019. The shortlist was announced May 15, 2019. The winners were announced May 29, 2019.

Fiction shortlist

 Slave Old Man by Patrick Chamoiseau, translated from French by Linda Coverdale (Martinique, New Press) 
Congo Inc.: Bismarck’s Testament by In Koli Jean Bofane, translated from French by Marjolijn de Jager (Democratic Republic of Congo, Indiana University Press) 
The Hospital by Ahmed Bouanani, translated from French by Lara Vergnaud (Morocco, New Directions) 
Pretty Things by Virginie Despentes, translated from French by Emma Ramadan (France, Feminist Press)
Moon Brow by Shahriar Mandanipour, translated from Persian by Sara Khalili (Iran, Restless Books)
Bricks and Mortar by Clemens Meyer, translated from German by Katy Derbyshire (Germany, Fitzcarraldo Editions) 
Convenience Store Woman by Sayaka Murata, translated from Japanese by Ginny Tapley Takemori (Japan, Grove)
The Governesses by Anne Serre, translated from French by Mark Hutchinson (France, New Directions)
Öræfï by Ófeigur Sigurðsson, translated from Icelandic by Lytton Smith (Iceland, Deep Vellum)
Fox by Dubravka Ugresic, translated from Croatian by Ellen Elias-Bursac and David Williams (Croatia, Open Letter)

Poetry shortlist

 Of Death. Minimal Odes by Hilda Hilst, translated from Portuguese by Laura Cesarco Eglin (Brazil, co-im-press) 
The Future Has an Appointment with the Dawn by Tanella Boni, translated from French by Todd Fredson (Cote D’Ivoire, University of Nebraska)
Moss & Silver by Jure Detela, translated from Slovenian by Raymond Miller and Tatjana Jamnik (Slovenia, Ugly Duckling) 
Autobiography of Death by Kim Hyesoon, translated from Korean by Don Mee Choi (Korea, New Directions)
Negative Space by Luljeta Lleshanaku, translated from Albanian by Ani Gjika (Albania, New Directions)

2020 
The longlist for fiction and poetry was announced April 1, 2020. The shortlist was announced May 11, 2020. The winners were announced May 29, 2020 in a public Zoom meeting.

Fiction shortlist

 EEG by Daša Drndić, translated from Croatian by Celia Hawkesworth (Croatia, New Directions)
Animalia by Jean-Baptiste Del Amo, translated from French by Frank Wynne (France, Grove)
Stalingrad by Vasily Grossman, translated from Russian by Robert Chandler and Elizabeth Chandler (Russia, New York Review Books)
Die, My Love by Ariana Harwicz, translated from Spanish by Sara Moses and Carolina Orloff (Argentina, Charco Press)
Good Will Come From the Sea by Christos Ikonomou, translated from Greek by Karen Emmerich (Greece, Archipelago Books)
The Memory Police by Yoko Ogawa, translated from Japanese by Stephen Snyder (Japan, Pantheon)
77 by Guillermo Saccomanno, translated from Spanish by Andrea G. Labinger (Argentina, Open Letter Books)
Beyond Babylon by Igiaba Scego, translated from Italian by Aaron Robertson (Italy, Two Lines Press)
Drive Your Plow Over the Bones of the Dead by Olga Tokarczuk, translated from Polish by Antonia Lloyd-Jones (Poland, Riverhead)
Territory of Light by Yuko Tsushima, translated from Japanese by Geraldine Harcourt (Japan, Farrar, Straus and Giroux)

Poetry shortlist

 Time by Etel Adnan, translated from French by Sarah Riggs (Lebanon, Nightboat Books)
Aviva-No by Shimon Adaf, translated from Hebrew by Yael Segalovitz (Israel, Alice James Books)
Materia Prima by Amanda Berenguer, translated from Spanish by Gillian Brassil, Anna Deeny Morales, Mónica de la Torre, Urayoán Noel, Jeannine Marie Pitas, Kristin Dykstra, Kent Johnson, and Alex Verdolini (Uruguay, Ugly Duckling Presse)
Next Loves by Stéphane Bouquet, translated from French by Lindsay Turner (France, Nightboat Books)
Camouflage by Lupe Gómez, translated from Galician by Erín Moure (Spain, Circumference Books)

2021-present 
The award went on hiatus in 2021.

Notes

External links
Best Translated Book Award, official website

Translation awards
International literary awards
American literary awards
Awards established in 2007
University of Rochester
English-language literary awards